Sithu Aye  (born 26 June 1990) is a Scottish-Burmese guitarist, musician, and producer based in Scotland. He began his career with the release of his first album, Cassini, in 2011, which was self-recorded and independently released. He has released five full-length albums and six EPs. His latest album, 10 Years: Remixes and Reimaginings, was released November 29, 2021. He has toured in Japan with Reflections and Protest The Hero, the UK and Europe with Skyharbor, the UK with Galactic Empire and the US and Canada with Haken.

Music career
Sithu Aye started playing guitar at age 12. He wrote and recorded his first album Cassini using software amp modelers and his laptop in his university's dormitory. Subsequently, many of his following releases were written and recorded while studying Physics at University of St Andrews, such as Invent the Universe, Isles EP and 26. Sithu wrote and produced his EP 26 over the course of four days to release it on June 26, 2013, which marked his 23rd birthday as well as the day he graduated with a Master's degree in Physics.

After his graduation Sithu Aye worked as a Technology Consulting Analyst for Deloitte until 2016. In this time period he wrote and recorded Pulse, Senpai EP and Set Course for Andromeda. With the release of the latter he announced quitting his job and pursuing a full-time career as a musician. A month after quitting his job, he went on a Japan tour with Protest the Hero.

During 2018, he took a break from touring to write his album Homebound, which was released on December 17 of the same year and was made available at the start of December to his supporters on patreon.
In 2019 he headlined a tour in the UK in support of his album Homebound and toured Europe supporting Intervals. He also worked on a follow up to his Senpai EP series, which he announced to be more of a full-length album this time and accompanied by a Visual Novel themed digital story booklet.

On December 12, 2020, Sithu Aye released the first single Time to Decide! on his YouTube channel, where he also announced his new album Senpai III to be released on January 8, 2021 on all platforms except patreon, where it was released immediately for all supporters of a certain tier. With 10 songs Senpai III is the first full-length album of the Senpai series and is also intended to be the last. The album also stands out from his other releases by the music itself not being the singular focus, since it contains a digital novella, telling a continuous story with each chapter being accompanied by the correspondingly titled song.

Style
Sithu Aye's music can be described as instrumental progressive metal that is focused on lead guitar, influenced by prominent artists of the early djent scene, such as Periphery and Animals as Leaders. He describes his style as 'happy progressive metal'. His two Senpai EPs are also influenced by Japanese anime music and artwork.

Gear
Sithu is a Mayones artist, using their Regius, Setius and Duvell guitar models. He also is a D'Addario artist, using their NYXL strings and Dunlop artist, having used Jazz III XL guitar picks and is currently using Dunlop Flow picks.

Discography

Albums
 Cassini (2011)
 Invent the Universe (2012)
 Set Course For Andromeda (2016)
 Homebound (2018)
 Senpai III (2021)
 10 Years: Remixes and Reimagines (2021)

EPs
 Isles EP (2012)
 26 (2013)
 I (2013) (split with Plini)
 Pulse (2014)
 Senpai EP「先輩EP」(2015)
 Senpai EP II: The Noticing (2017)

Singles
 "Oceania" (2014)
 "Senpai, Please Notice Me!" (2015) 
 "Set Course for Andromeda!!!" (2016) 
 "Spiral" (2016) 
 "Transient Transistors" (2016) 
 "And Here's to Many More" (2016) 
 "Primary Ignition" (2018) 
 "Runaway Reaction" (2018) 
 "Time to Decide!" (2020)

Awards
Sithu was nominated for a Scottish Alternative Music Award in the best metal category on September 20, 2017.

References

External links
 Official Facebook Page
 

1990 births
Djent
Living people
Progressive metal guitarists
Scottish heavy metal guitarists